Curaçao is an island in the Caribbean Sea which is a constituent country of the Kingdom of the Netherlands.

Curaçao may also refer to:
 Curaçao and Dependencies/Territory Curaçao, the name of the Dutch possession comprising Aruba, Bonaire, Curaçao, Saba, Sint Eustatius and Sint Maarten.
 Curaçao (liqueur), a liqueur from the island Curaçao
 Curacao (retail store)

See also
 Curacoa (disambiguation)
 Curassow